Kelly Road is a settlement in Prince Edward Island. Kelly Road is also the name of the approximately 5 km length of Route 142 between Woodstock and Route 12.

References 

Communities in Prince County, Prince Edward Island